Hugh Gladney Grant (September 2, 1888 – August 1972) was an American diplomat from the state of Alabama.
Grant was educated at Samford University (previously Howard College) in Homewood, Alabama.
He later taught at Auburn University, (previously Alabama Polytechnic Institute), before entering government service.

Government Service
From 1927 to 1933, he was secretary to Senator Hugo Black.
He served as US ambassador to Albania from 1935 to 1939, during which King Zog led the Albanian government.
From 1940 to 1941, he was US ambassador to Thailand.

Writings
Grant published multiple books and articles, including "A war is on in America: A racial revolution involving our whole social structure" (1956).

References

External links 
 Collection at Wichita University
 state department site for Grant

1888 births
1972 deaths
Ambassadors of the United States to Albania
Samford University alumni
Auburn University faculty
20th-century American diplomats